Lenox Hill is a documentary streaming television series that was developed by Ruthie Shatz and Adi Barash which premiered on Netflix on June 10, 2020. The premise mainly revolves around the lives of  four medical professionals in the areas of neurosurgery, emergency medicine, and obstetrics and gynecology at the Lenox Hill Hospital.

Release
Lenox Hill was released on June 10, 2020, on Netflix.

Participants
 David Langer: Chair of award-winning Neurosurgery department
 John Boockvar: Vice Chair of Neurosurgery 
 Mirtha Macri: Emergency Physician
 Amanda Little-Richardson: Chief OB-GYN resident in her last year. She gives birth in the "Full Circle" episode.

Episodes

Reception

On review aggregator Rotten Tomatoes, the series holds an approval rating of 100% based on 15 critic reviews with an average rating of 8/10. The website's critical consensus reads, "An intimate portrait of medical professionals that explores triumphs and complications in equal measure, Lenox Hill is as engrossing as it is eye opening." On Metacritic, it has a weighted average score of 87 out of 100 based on 8 reviews, indicating "universal acclaim".

Daniel Fienberg of The Hollywood Reporter gave a review stating,"  Lenox Hill aims to inspire, and the eight-episode first season ends up more emotionally nourishing than intellectually satisfying—not that there's anything necessarily wrong with that." Daniel D'Addario at Variety said, "With an openhearted curiosity about its subjects and a patient, clear eye, the series comes to no conclusions about the way we administer medical care now, but leaves its viewer with ample information to draw his or her own."

In its 'Best of 2020' reviews the New York Times included Lenox Hill in it list of 'Best Shows Ending in 2020.'  The Times critics called it "a riveting narrative and a modern wisdom text about the ebbs and flows of life and loss."

References

External links
 

2020 American television series debuts
2020s American documentary television series
English-language Netflix original programming
Netflix original documentary television series
Television shows set in New York City